Sidi Gaber railway station is one of two main railway stations in Alexandria, Egypt.

It was constructed in the 1850s and is the oldest train station in Egypt.

See also 

 Alexandria

References 

Railway stations in Egypt